Mundi Chhurimaran is a village in the Firozpur district of Punjab, India. It is located in the Zira tehsil.

Demographics 

According to the 2011 census of India, Mundi Chhurimaran has 419 households. The effective literacy rate (i.e. the literacy rate of population excluding children aged 6 and below) is 63.78%.

References 

Villages in Zira tehsil